Free Spirit or Free Spirits may refer to:

Media
 Free Spirit (TV series), a 1989–90 American fantasy sitcom
 Free Spirit (film), a 1951 Argentine drama film
 ”Free Spirit” (The Outer Limits), a 2001 episode in the 1995 series
Free Spirit (comics), a fictional super-hero in the Marvel Universe

Music
Free Spirit (band), a Christian spiritual & gospel band that came out of the Free Methodist Church. Active between 1971 & 1980.
Free Spirit (band), a hard-rock band from Finland, formed 2005 
The Free Spirits, an American jazz-rock group in the 1960s

Albums
Free Spirit (Bonnie Tyler album), 1995
Free Spirit (Imani Coppola album), 2010
Free Spirit (Khalid album), 2019
Free Spirits (album), a 1976 Mary Lou Williams album
Free Spirit, a 1974 album by Hudson Ford
Free Spirit, a 1980 album by Ken Hensley
Free Spirit, a 1989 album by Ted Brown
Free Spirit, a 1991 album by Terry Burrus
Free Spirit, a 2018 album by Paul Rodgers

Songs
"Free Spirit" (Jedward song), 2014
"Free Spirit" (Hermon Hitson song), 1966
"Free Spirit", a 1967 song by Crispian St. Peters
"Free Spirit", a 1972 song by Birtha
"Free Spirit", a 1977 song by Dennis Coffey
"Free Spirit", a 1994 song by Kim Appleby
"Free Spirit", a 2019 song by Khalid from Free Spirit

Other
 Brethren of the Free Spirit, a medieval heretical movement
FREE SPIRIT, a frequent flyer program of Spirit Airlines
"The Free Spirit," part two of Friedrich Nietzsche's Beyond Good and Evil
CEI Free Spirit Mk II, an American home-built aircraft design

See also 
Freethought, a philosophical viewpoint asserting that beliefs should be rational instead of dictated by authority